Navasia is a monotypic genus of grasshoppers belonging to the subfamily Catantopinae (no tribe assigned).

Species:
 Navasia insularis Kirby, 1914

References

Acrididae
Acrididae genera
Monotypic Orthoptera genera